David Martin Norris (born 20 February 1981) is an English professional footballer who plays as a midfielder for Lancaster City. Born in Stamford, he has played in the Football League for Hull City, Plymouth Argyle, Ipswich Town, Portsmouth, Leeds United, Peterborough United, Yeovil Town and Blackpool. Norris has made more than 400 Football League appearances.

Club career

Early years
Having started his career at Southern League Midland Division club Stamford, Norris joined Boston United in 1999, who were playing one league higher at the time. He scored ten goals in 26 league appearances in his first season and one more in five cup matches. Boston won promotion to the Football Conference that season as Southern League Premier Division champions. Norris was transferred to First Division club Bolton Wanderers for a fee in excess of £50,000 in January 2000, which was a record transfer fee received by Boston at the time. He returned to Boston on loan in December and scored four goals in five league appearances. In March 2002, Norris joined Football League Third Division club Hull City on loan, where he played in six matches and scored once. In two-and-a-half years with Bolton, he made one appearance in the FA Cup and four in the League Cup.

Plymouth Argyle
Norris initially joined Football League Second Division club Plymouth Argyle on loan for a month in October 2002. He scored the decisive goal on his debut in a 1–0 win at Crewe Alexandra, and made seven league appearances before joining the club permanently for an undisclosed fee in December. Argyle won promotion to the EFL Championship as Second Division champions in 2004 with Norris scoring five goals in 45 league appearances that season. He won the club's Player of the Year award in 2006 and, after more than five years at the club, Norris had made 243 appearances in all competitions, scoring 28 goals.

Ipswich Town
In the January 2008 transfer window Ipswich Town had two bids rejected by the Plymouth board despite Norris handing in a transfer request. Ipswich lodged one final, increased bid which was finally accepted after brokering a deal with Bolton that would allow Plymouth to receive more than the 50% Norris' clause initially gave them. Norris finally signed for Ipswich Town on 31 January 2008 for an undisclosed fee, signing a contract until 2011. He scored his first goal for the club in the 1–1 draw with Southampton away from home.

In November 2008, Norris was heavily criticised for a controversial goal celebration against Blackpool, interpreted as a show of support for jailed friend and former Plymouth goalkeeper Luke McCormick. McCormick was returning from Norris' wedding in June 2008 when he fell asleep at the wheel due to the effects of alcohol and caused the deaths of two young boys. He was sentenced to seven years and four months prison time in October of that year.

The family of the bereaved took offence at Norris' gesture and he was subsequently fined and warned by Ipswich. He was once again caught out when he told the Ipswich website he had not intended the celebration as a show of support to Luke McCormick and the statement was later changed by the club, adding further to the controversy. The statement now reads that the celebration was in fact a message to Luke McCormick. Later that week it was revealed that Norris was fined £25,000 by Ipswich and would make a face-to-face apology to Phil and Amanda Peak (the parents of the two boys).

Eventually, In August 2010, Norris became the Ipswich Town captain. Norris was handed the captain's armband by Manager Roy Keane after the departure of the then captain Jonathan Walters to Stoke City. In the summer of 2011 Norris turned down a new contract extension at Ipswich Town, with the club only prepared to offer him a two-year extension, a year short of the midfielders demands, with rival Championship club Leeds United heavily linked with signing him on a free transfer.

Portsmouth
On 15 June 2011, Norris signed for Portsmouth on a free transfer after turning down a new two-year deal with Ipswich. On 6 August, in his debut league appearance for Portsmouth, he scored against Middlesbrough in a game which ended 2–2. He scored his second goal for Portsmouth in a match away at West Ham United, which ended 4–3 to the home team. At first it was believed that Benjani Mwaruwari had scored the goal, but replays later showed that Norris had already put the ball over the line when Benjani headed in the rebound.

His first goal at Fratton Park came in a 2–0 home victory against Barnsley. With the match goalless, Karim Rekik headed the ball down to Norris, who controlled and then volleyed it into the net from the edge of the penalty area. On 7 April 2012, Norris scored a spectacular equalising goal against arch-rivals Southampton in the 93rd minute to secure Portsmouth a point.

Leeds United
In July 2012, Norris agreed the deal to join Leeds United from Portsmouth, to join his former teammates Jason Pearce, Luke Varney and Jamie Ashdown. Norris was allocated the number 19 shirt for the 2012–13 season on 3 August.

Norris made his competitive début for Leeds in the first game of the season against Shrewsbury Town in the League Cup on 11 August. Norris was also named the Leeds United captain for the match and also scored his first goal in the same game. Norris made his league début for Leeds in their 1–0 victory against Wolverhampton Wanderers. On 7 September, Norris was ruled out for a month after picking up a thigh injury, as a result of the injury, Leeds signed Michael Tonge on loan to help cover his absence. Norris made his first start since returning from injury against Charlton Athletic on 23 October, in the same game Norris scored his second goal of the season which was his first league goal for Leeds. Norris scored his third goal of the season for Leeds against Huddersfield Town to help earn Leeds a 4–2 victory on 1 December.

Norris missed the final three games of the season under new manager Brian McDermott due to a knee injury that required surgery, and on 15 August 2013, with Leeds needing to raise finances to help fund signings, he was made available for transfer alongside teammates El Hadji Diouf and Adam Drury.

Norris was out of favour throughout the 2013–2014 season under McDermott, making only one appearance in the League Cup. He featured in the development squad, but was also hampered by another knee injury that kept him out over the winter period.

Norris made his first appearance for Leeds in over a year in the last game of Head Coach Dave Hockaday against Bradford City in the League Cup, providing an assist for striker Matt Smith who opened the scoring in a 2–1 defeat on 27 August 2014.

He was finally released by Leeds United on 2 February 2015, when his contract was cancelled by mutual consent.

Peterborough United
Norris joined League One side Peterborough United on a short-term contract on 13 February 2015, until the end of the 2014–15 season. He was allocated the number 23 shirt for the club.

Yeovil Town
On 21 August 2015, Norris signed for League Two side Yeovil Town on non-contract terms, linking up with his former Plymouth manager Paul Sturrock. He made his only appearance in the 2–0 defeat against Oxford United, on 29 August 2015, and left the club on 1 September 2015.

Blackpool
Norris joined Blackpool on 3 September 2015, on a contract until the end of the season. He scored his first and only goal for Blackpool in a 5–0 win over Scunthorpe United on 16 January 2016.

Leatherhead
In September 2016 he signed for non-league Leatherhead.

Salford City
In February 2017 he signed for non-league Salford City.

Shaw Lane
In August 2017, Norris joined Shaw Lane.

Return to Boston
In September 2018, 18 years after initially leaving the club, Norris returned to Boston United.

Lancaster City
In December 2018 Norris signed for Northern Premier League club Lancaster City. His first appearance was on 1 December at North Ferriby United, but North Ferriby left the league, with their record expunged in March 2019, so Norris's debut in real terms was the following week, when he appeared as a substitute in a home game against Gainsborough Trinity.

International career
Norris qualifies to play for the Republic of Ireland, through his mother, who has family in Kildare. Though he has never been selected to play for them, he was contacted by Steve Staunton (Ireland's former manager) about playing.

Career statistics

Honours

Club
Boston United
Southern League Premier Division: 1999–2000

Plymouth Argyle
Football League Second Division: 2003–04

Individual
Plymouth Argyle Player of the Year: 2005–06

References

External links

1981 births
Living people
People from Stamford, Lincolnshire
English footballers
English people of Irish descent
Association football midfielders
Stamford A.F.C. players
Boston United F.C. players
Bolton Wanderers F.C. players
Hull City A.F.C. players
Plymouth Argyle F.C. players
Ipswich Town F.C. players
Portsmouth F.C. players
Leeds United F.C. players
Peterborough United F.C. players
Yeovil Town F.C. players
Blackpool F.C. players
Leatherhead F.C. players
Salford City F.C. players
Shaw Lane A.F.C. players
Lancaster City F.C. players
Southern Football League players
National League (English football) players
English Football League players